Pataskala United Methodist Church is a historic church building at 458 S. Main Street in Pataskala, Ohio.

The building, which has elements of Gothic Revival styling, was constructed in 1897.  It was added to the National Register of Historic Places in 1983.

Its history and significance was described in 1979 as:Pataskala United Methodist Church is significant to the religious history of the community. Architecturally the church is an example of late 19th Century Eccleastical style often found in small towns and rural areas. Architectural elements include the Gothic Revival inspired squat buttressed bell tower and pointed arched stain glass windows and the Stick style exposed truss in gable over the side entrance. Methodism came to Lima Township and Pataskala in 1853. One of the three most prominent religions established in Pataskala, the United Methodist congregation was comprised in part by local business leaders.

It was listed on the National Register as a follow-on to a 1980 study of historic resources in Pataskala.

References

United Methodist churches in Ohio
Churches on the National Register of Historic Places in Ohio
Gothic Revival church buildings in Ohio
Churches completed in 1897
Buildings and structures in Licking County, Ohio
National Register of Historic Places in Licking County, Ohio